Tomáš Gerát (born 15 June 1993) is a Slovak football player who currently plays for MFK Tatran Liptovský Mikuláš as a midfielder.

Career

MFK Ružomberok
He made his professional debut for Ružomberok against ViOn Zlaté Moravce on 19 July 2014.

References

External links
 
 Futbalnet profile
 MFK Ružomberok profile
 Eurofotbal profile

1993 births
Living people
Slovak footballers
Association football midfielders
MFK Ružomberok players
FC DAC 1904 Dunajská Streda players
MŠK Rimavská Sobota players
FK Železiarne Podbrezová players
MFK Tatran Liptovský Mikuláš players
Slovak Super Liga players
2. Liga (Slovakia) players